Abanuea was an island of the Republic of Kiribati. It was a subdivision of the main Tarawa Island. The name translates to "land of Chiefs".

Despite being part of the Republic, it disappeared under water in the 1990s. While uninhabited at the time, it was commonly used by fishermen. It and another island  Tebua Tarawa disappeared in 1999.

References 

Islands of Kiribati
Former islands